Qovaq-e Sofla or Qavaq-e Sofla may refer to:
 Qavaq-e Sofla, East Azerbaijan
 Qovaq-e Sofla, Zanjan